De Lindenhof is a restaurant located in Giethoorn, Netherlands. It is a fine dining restaurant that was awarded one Michelin star in the period 1996-2004 and two Michelin stars in the period 2005–present. GaultMillau awarded the restaurant 18.0 out of 20 points. 

De Lindenhof is a member of Les Patrons Cuisiniers.

See also
List of Michelin starred restaurants in the Netherlands

Sources and references 

Restaurants in the Netherlands
Michelin Guide starred restaurants in the Netherlands